The men's triple jump at the 2018 IAAF World U20 Championships was held at Ratina Stadium on 13 and 14 July.

Records

Results

Qualification
The qualification round took place on 13 July, in two groups, with both groups starting at 18:00. Athletes attaining a mark of at least 15.80 metres ( Q ) or at least the 12 best performers ( q ) qualified for the final.

Final
The final was held on 14 July at 15:00.

References

triple jump
Triple jump at the World Athletics U20 Championships